Ministry of Housing and Local Government v Sharp [1970] 2 QB 223, is an English tort law case concerning assumption of responsibility.

Facts
An employee of the authority failed to exercise reasonable skill and care in searching for entries in the local land charges register. The search certificate prepared by the clerk negligently failed to record a charge of £1,828 11s. 5d. in favour of the Ministry.

Judgment
Lord Denning MR held the local authority was liable to the Ministry for the employee's incompetence. At 268 he rejected that a duty of care only arose when there was a voluntary assumption of responsibility, rather "from the fact that the person making it knows, or ought to know, that others, being his neighbours in this regard, would act on the faith of the statement being accurate." Lord Denning MR's judgment ran on the law as follows.

See also
Smith v Eric S Bush

English tort case law
Lord Denning cases
Court of Appeal (England and Wales) cases
1970 in British law
1970 in case law